Ornithinimicrobium algicola is a Gram-positive and non-spore-forming bacterium species from the genus Ornithinimicrobium which has been isolated from the green Ulva.

References 

Actinomycetia
Bacteria described in 2015